The 2012 King George VI and Queen Elizabeth Stakes was a horse race held at Ascot Racecourse on Saturday 21 July 2012. It was the 62nd King George VI and Queen Elizabeth Stakes.

The winner was Gestut Burg Eberstein & Teruya Yoshida's Danedream, a four-year-old bay filly trained in Germany by Peter Schiergen and ridden by Andrasch Starke. Danedream's victory was the first for his jockey, trainer and owner and the first by a German-trained horse. Danedream was the first female to win the race since Time Charter in 1983.

Danedream was the European Champion Three-year-old Filly of 2011 when her win included the Oaks d'Italia, Grosser Preis von Berlin, Grosser Preis von Baden and Prix de l'Arc de Triomphe. After winning on her debut as a four-year-old she had failed to show her best form when finishing fourth in the Grand Prix de Saint-Cloud in June. In the 2012 King George VI and Queen Elizabeth Stakes, Danedream started the 9/1 fifth choice in the betting behind Sea Moon, Nathaniel (the previous year's winner), St Nicholas Abbey and the Melbourne Cup winner Dunaden. Danedream produced a sustained run in the straight to catch Nathaniel 75 yards from the finish and won by a nose, with St Nicholas Abbey one and a half lengths back in third.

This was the last running of the race (until at least 2017) to be shown on the BBC, who had televised every running since the race's inception in 1951.

Race details
 Sponsor: Betfair
 Purse: £983,700; First prize: £567,100
 Surface: Turf
 Going: Good to Soft
 Distance: 12 furlongs
 Number of runners: 10
 Winner's time: 2:31.62

Full result

 Abbreviations: nse = nose; nk = neck; shd = head; hd = head

Winner's details
Further details of the winner, Danedream
 Sex: Filly
 Foaled: 7 May 2008
 Country: Germany
 Sire: Lomitas; Dam: Danedrop (Danehill)
 Owner: Gestut Burg Eberstein & Teruya Yoshida
 Breeder: Gestut Brummerhof

Subsequent breeding careers
Leading progeny of participants in the 2012 King George VI and Queen Elizabeth Stakes.

Sires of Classic winners
Nathaniel (2nd)
 Enable – 1st Epsom Oaks (2017), 1st Irish Oaks (2017), Horse of the Year (2017, 2019)
 Channel – 1st Prix de Diane (2019)
 God Given – 1st Premio Lydia Tesio (2018)
 Concertista – 1st Dawn Run Mares' Novices' Hurdle (2020)

Sires of Group/Grade One winners
Reliable Man (4th)
 Sentimental Miss – 1st New Zealand Oaks (2019)
 Miami Bound – 1st Kennedy Oaks (2019)
 Naida – 2nd Preis der Diana (2019)

Other Stallions
Deep Brillante (8th) – Mozu Bello (1st Nikkei Shinshun Hai 2020)Dunaden (6th) – Minor flat and jumps winnersMasked Marvel (9th) – Minor jumps winnersSea Moon (5th) – Minor flat runner

Broodmare
Danedream (1st) – Faylaq (4th Cumberland Lodge Stakes 2019)

References

King George
 2012
King George VI and Queen Elizabeth Stakes
King George VI and Queen Elizabeth Stakes
2010s in Berkshire